Sierning is a municipality in the district of Steyr-Land in the Austrian state of Upper Austria.

Geography
Sierning is located between the city of Steyr and the health resort Bad Hall on the Steyr river.

References

Cities and towns in Steyr-Land District